Isaac W. Choy is an American politician and a former Democratic member of the Hawaii House of Representatives representing District 23 from January 2013 to January 2019. Choy consecutively served from 2009 until 2013 in the District 24 seat.

In 2020, Choy was appointed to serve as director of the state Department of Taxation.

Education
Choy earned his BS in business administration from San Jose State University.

Elections
2012 Redistricted to District 23, and with Democratic Representative Tom Brower redistricted to District 22, Choy and his 2010 Republican challenger Zach Thompson were both unopposed for their August 11, 2012 primaries,  setting up a rematch; Choy won the November 6, 2012 General election with 7,502 votes (71.9%) against Thompson.
2008 When Democratic Representative Kirk Caldwell retired from the Legislature to run for mayor of Honolulu and left the District 24 seat open, Choy was unopposed for the September 20, 2008 Democratic Primary, winning with 3,021 votes, and won the November 4, 2008 General election with 6,689 votes (62.4%) against Republican nominee Jerilyn Jeffryes.
2010 Choy won the September 18, 2010 Democratic Primary with 3,658 votes (53.8%), and won the November 2, 2010 General election with 6,545 votes (70.4%) against Republican nominee Zach Thompson.

State microbe legislation
In 2017 Isaac Choy submitted legislation in the Hawaii House of Representatives to make Flavobacterium akiainvivens the state microbe.  This was mirrored by Brian Taniguchi in the Hawaii Senate.  This continues an effort started by James Tokioka in 2013, and later contested in 2014 by Senator Glenn Wakai's SB3124 bill proposing Aliivibrio fischeri instead.  , Hawaii has no official state microbe.

References

External links
Official page at the Hawaii State Legislature
Campaign site
 

Place of birth missing (living people)
Year of birth missing (living people)
Living people
Democratic Party members of the Hawaii House of Representatives
San Jose State University alumni
United States Marines
21st-century American politicians
Hawaii politicians of Chinese descent